Platypezina connexa is a species of fly in the genus Platypezina

References

Platypezidae
Insects described in 1858